Delia Mayer (born 8 March 1967) is a Hong Kong-born Swiss actress and singer. She is known for her roles as Isabel Becker in the German television series Die Cleveren and as Miriam Shapiro in the German-American television drama mini-series Unorthodox.

 Biography 
Mayer was born on 8 March 1967 in Hong Kong. She is the daughter of Swiss jazz musician Vali Mayer and sister of Jojo Mayer, and grew up near Zürich. She trained in acting, dance, and singing in Vienna and classical singing at the Zürich Conservatory and the BGZ Opera School.

She played Isabel Becker in the German television series Die Cleveren and as Miriam Shapiro in the German-American television miniseries Unorthodox''.

References 

Living people
1967 births
20th-century Swiss actresses
21st-century Swiss actresses
20th-century Swiss women opera singers
21st-century Swiss women opera singers
Swiss film actresses
Swiss television actresses